Poggio Santa Cecilia is a village in Tuscany, central Italy, administratively a frazione of the comune of Rapolano Terme, province of Siena.

Poggio Santa Cecilia is about 30 km from Siena and 4 km from Rapolano Terme.

Bibliography 
 

Frazioni of Rapolano Terme